Sex Hygiene is a 1942 American drama film short directed by John Ford and Otto Brower. The official U.S. military training film is in the instructional social guidance film genre, offering adolescent and adult behavioural advice, medical information, and moral exhortations. The Academy Film Archive preserved Sex Hygiene in 2007.

Plot
Several servicemen relax by playing pool at their base. One later visits a prostitute and contracts syphilis. As a result of his unfortunate experience, there is an opportunity for sexual health information about syphilis, how it is spread and how its spread can be prevented.

Cast
 Kenneth Alexander as Soldier
 Robert Conway as Soldier
 Robert Cornell as Soldier
 Richard Derr as Soldier
 Herbert Gunn as Soldier
 Robert Lowery as Pool player No. 2
 George Reeves as Pool player No. 1
 Robert Shaw as Pool player
 Charles Tannen as Soldier
 Charles Trowbridge as Medical officer
 Basil Walker as Soldier
 Robert Weldon as Soldier

See also
 List of Allied propaganda films of World War II
 Social guidance films

References

External links

Complete film Sex Hygiene on Google

1942 films
1942 drama films
American black-and-white films
Films directed by John Ford
Films directed by Otto Brower
American social guidance and drug education films
American World War II propaganda shorts
Films produced by Darryl F. Zanuck
Films about syphilis
American drama short films
1940s English-language films
1940s American films